A Quiet Passion is a 2016 British biographical film written and directed by Terence Davies about the life of American poet Emily Dickinson. The film stars Cynthia Nixon as the reclusive poet. It co-stars Emma Bell as young Dickinson, Jennifer Ehle, Duncan Duff, and Keith Carradine. The film premiered at the 66th Berlin International Film Festival in February 2016 and was released in the United Kingdom on 7 April 2017. It won the Grand Prix at Film Fest Gent.

Plot

Cast

Production 
On 10 September 2012, it was announced that Cynthia Nixon was set to play Emily Dickinson in a biopic directed by Terence Davies. In May 2015, after a long time in development hell, A Quiet Passion finally began production in Belgium. The film was shot at AED Studios in a replica of Dickinson's house. Additional scenes were also filmed in Amherst and Pelham, Massachusetts. Jennifer Ehle was cast in a key supporting role opposite Nixon.

Reception 
On review aggregator website Rotten Tomatoes, the film holds an approval rating of 91%, based on 152 reviews, and an average rating of 7.8/10. The website's critical consensus reads, "A Quiet Passion offers a finely detailed portrait of a life whose placid passage may not have been inherently cinematic, but is made more affecting by Cynthia Nixon's strong performance." On Metacritic, the film has a weighted average score of 78 out of 100, based on 31 critics, indicating "generally favorable reviews".

The film was highly praised by the British newspapers The Guardian and The Independent, which described the film as a 'Masterpiece of Mood'. Richard Brody of The New Yorker called it a "masterwork" and stated that the film would "take its place as one of [Davies'] finest creations". Had the film been given a limited release in the United States before 2017, Brody would have placed it first in his list of best films of 2016. Internationally, The New York Times stated: "This Emily Dickinson biopic possesses a poetic sensibility perfectly suited to its subject and a deep, idiosyncratic intuition about what might have made her tick." The Washington Post wrote: "Davies is a master of the slow build, lyrically evoking both the dreaminess and gravity of his subject and her verse".

References

External links 
Music Box Films official site

2016 films
2016 biographical drama films
2010s historical drama films
Biographical films about poets
British biographical drama films
British historical drama films
Cultural depictions of Emily Dickinson
Cultural depictions of Jenny Lind
Films directed by Terence Davies
Films set in the 19th century
Films set in Massachusetts
Films shot in Belgium
Films shot in Massachusetts
Films about mental health
2010s English-language films
2010s British films